Uvagut TV (translates to Our TV) is a Canadian licence-exempted Category B specialty television channel owned by Nunavut Independent Television Network.

It is Canada's first television channel devoted exclusively to Inuktitut language programming, and only the second service devoted to indigenous communities in Canada after the Aboriginal Peoples Television Network.

The channel broadcasts a variety of programming including children’s shows, movies, documentaries, and cultural and current affairs programming.

The channel launched on January 18, 2021 initially on Arctic Co-op Cable in Nunavut and the Northwest Territories, as well as nationally by Shaw Direct and online.

References

External links
Official website

Television stations in Nunavut
Television stations in the Northwest Territories
2021 establishments in Canada
Television channels and stations established in 2021
Indigenous television in Canada
Analog cable television networks in Canada
Inuktitut